Heaven's Gate: The Cult of Cults is an American documentary miniseries revolving around the religious group Heaven's Gate and its leader Marshall Applewhite. It consists of four episodes and premiered on December 3, 2020, on HBO Max.

Synopsis
Told through the eyes of former members and loved ones of former members, the series follows Heaven's Gate and its leader Marshall Applewhite. The series included never before seen footage of the cult.

Episodes

Production
In October 2019, it was announced HBO Max had greenlit a 4-part documentary series following the Heaven's Gate with Clay Tweel set to direct and executive produce with CNN Original Studios and Stitcher set to produce the series.

Reception
On Rotten Tomatoes, the series holds an approval rating of 86%. On Metacritic, the series has a weighted average score of 67 out of 100, based on 4 critics, indicating "generally favorable reviews".

References

External links
 

2020 American television series debuts
2020s American documentary television series
2020s American television miniseries
HBO Max original programming
Heaven's Gate
Television series about cults
True crime television series